is the creator of the hit manga series +Anima as well as Fortune Quest L and did the story and art of Nui!. She also created a short manga called "Wandal Wandering!".

Works

+Anima
+Anima is a manga series based around four children with the powers to change into a certain animal to defend themselves. The four children, Cooro, Nana, Husky, and Senri, travel around the country of Astaria looking for other +Anima and a home. They encounter friends and enemies alike as they search for a place to call home.

Nui! 
Nui! is about a girl named Kaya who has just celebrated her sixteenth birthday; on that day, she discovers that her stuffed animal Purple is alive and has been secretly protecting Kaya all her life.

References

External links
 Natsumi Mukai at Media Arts Database 
★迎夏生先生ＦＣ

Living people
Manga artists from Chiba Prefecture
Year of birth missing (living people)